Samson Mamulia (1892–1937) was a Georgian Soviet politician and the First Secretary of the Georgian Communist Party from November 20, 1930 to October 13, 1931.  

In June 1937 he was imprisoned on the orders of Joseph Stalin in Tbilisi a month after his son's birth. Samson Mamulia was executed and his wife died in the Gulag.  His son Guram Mamulia was an activist for Meskhetian rights.

References

1892 births
1937 deaths
People from Kutais Governorate
First Secretaries of the Georgian Communist Party
Deaths by firearm in Russia
Executed politicians
Great Purge victims from Georgia (country)